The Tonnele Circle is an intersection in Jersey City, New Jersey, United States. It is named after Tonnele ["TUN-uh-lee"] Avenue, the north–south road that runs through it.

Entrances and exits
Entrances to and exits from Tonnele Circle are listed clockwise from north:
Tonnele Avenue north (U.S. Route 1/9)
entrance from Route 139 and Kennedy Boulevard
exit to Route 139
Tonnele Avenue south
entrance from Pulaski Skyway (U.S. Route 1/9)
Truck US 1/9
exit to Pulaski Skyway (U.S. Route 1/9)

History

Before the Pulaski Skyway was built, the cut through the New Jersey Palisades (now Route 139) ended at Tonnele Circle, where Tonnele Avenue went north and south, and the main road to Newark went west. To the east, just north of the road through the cut, was a connector road to Hudson County Boulevard (now renamed Kennedy Boulevard). When the Skyway was built, the old connection to Tonnele Circle became a left-side exit and entrance ramp to the Circle, with the Skyway passing over the Circle. Right-side exit and entrance ramps were provided between the Skyway and the Circle, with the southbound onramp exiting the circle north of the old road (now TRUCK US 1/9).

On September 14, 1938, a direct ramp, known as the Tonnele Circle Viaduct, opened from the cut, passing over Tonnele Circle, to TRUCK US 1/9. This greatly improved traffic, since southbound (westbound) trucks no longer had to pass through the circle. Northbound (eastbound) trucks still do, but they only cross the Tonnele Avenue south approach, which is relatively minor.

In mid-1952, Tonnele Circle was rebuilt. Northbound traffic from TRUCK US 1/9 could now go straight through the circle. Also at that time, or possibly earlier, the offramp from Route 139 was moved to the right side, and entered the Circle where the connector to Hudson County Boulevard had. The connector was modified to only go towards the Circle.

The Tonnele Circle was adjusted again in 2005. A ramp was added to permit vehicles heading southbound on Tonnele Avenue to access the Pulaski Skyway without entering the circle. Additionally, ramps around and through the circle were modified to improve traffic flow, and traffic lights were added and recalibrated to reduce the chances of cross traffic being in an intersection simultaneously.

In 2011, the New Jersey Department of Transportation completed a new approach route and began to demolish the original U.S. Route 1/9 Truck St. Paul's Viaduct and the Tonnele Circle Viaduct, deemed “structurally deficient and functionally obsolete”. Southbound traffic was routed to the new viaduct on February of that year, with northbound traffic being routed to the new viaduct in September of that year.

Naming
It is sometimes believed that the circle (and street) gets its name from the Holland Tunnel, since the circle was built for the tunnel. Hagstrom maps even label the circle as Tunnel's Traffic Circle. However, the circle was named after the street, and the street was probably named after a John Tonnele, who died in 1852, or one of his descendants. Information on the Tonnele family is sparse, but at least some of them lived in Jersey City, where the street now runs. The street was named by 1883.   There is some confusion about the spelling - whether the name has one 'L' or two - even within Jersey City, and street signs reflect both options. However, the U.S. Postal Service favors "Tonnele," which reflects the spelling of the man after whom the street is named.

See also

List of traffic circles in New Jersey
Saint Peter's Cemetery (Jersey City)
Odonyms in Hudson County, New Jersey

References

Traffic circles in New Jersey
Transportation in Jersey City, New Jersey
Streets in Hudson County, New Jersey
U.S. Route 1
U.S. Route 9